Days of Wine and Roses may refer to:

 "days of wine and roses", a phrase from the 1896 poem "Vitae Summa Brevis" by Ernest Dowson

Film 
 Days of Wine and Roses (Playhouse 90), a 1958 teleplay written by JP Miller 
 Days of Wine and Roses (film), a 1962 film adaptation written by Miller and directed by Blake Edwards
 "Days of Wine and Roses" (song), a song from the film, by Henry Mancini and Johnny Mercer

Music 
 Pat Boone Sings Days of Wine and Roses, a 1963 album by Pat Boone
 Days of Wine and Roses and Other TV Requests, a 1963 album by Andy Williams
 The Days of Wine and Roses, a 1982 album by Dream Syndicate
 Days of Wine and Roses - Live at the Jazz Standard, a 2000 jazz album by the Maria Schneider Orchestra

See also 
 "Naïve/The Days of Swine & Roses", a 1991 split single by KMFDM and My Life with the Thrill Kill Kult
 "Days of Wine and D'oh'ses", a 2000 episode of The Simpsons
 "The Nights of Wine and Roses", a 2012 song by Japandroids
 "Wine and Roses" (Schitt's Creek), a 2015 episode of Schitt's Creek
 "Wine and Roses", a 2022 episode of Better Call Saul